Gazania pectinata, the cockscomb Gazania, is a species of calendula native to the lower-lying regions and coastal plains of the Western Cape Province, South Africa.

Description
The flowers are yellow-to-orange, usually with black-to-brown spots, and born on long, glabrous-to-setose scapes. 
The involucre is also glabrous-to-setose and obtusely bell-shaped (campanulate), with a base that is broadly/obtusely connate. 
Along the length of the involucre are a number of parietal involucre scales/bracts, which are oblong in shape and arranged irregularly. 

The leaves are long and slender (linear-lanceolate), with acute tips, and usually pinnate or more rarely simple. The leaves have  smooth upper surfaces and woolly (tomentose) lower surfaces. 

In its growth form, G. pectinata is an annual (sometimes a perennial) and forms basal rosettes with only relatively short stems.

References

Flora of South Africa
pectinata